WWE The Music: A New Day, Vol. 10 is a compilation album released by World Wrestling Entertainment (WWE) on January 28, 2010. Unlike previous albums in the series, the album was released both in CD-R and digital download forms, exclusively on Amazon.com in the United States, the United Kingdom, Germany and France.

Track listing 
All tracks were written by Jim Johnston.

See also 

Music in professional wrestling

References 

2010 compilation albums
Rock compilation albums
Hip hop compilation albums
2010 soundtrack albums
Rock soundtracks
Hip hop soundtracks
WWE albums